Aliabad (also Romanized as ‘Alīābād) is a village in Qaedrahmat Rural District, Zagheh District, Khorramabad County, Lorestan Province, Iran. At the 2006 census, its population was 122, in 28 families.

References 

Towns and villages in Khorramabad County